Samuel Joel "Zero" Mostel (February 28, 1915 – September 8, 1977) was an American actor, comedian, and singer. He is best known for his portrayal of comic characters such as Tevye on stage in Fiddler on the Roof, Pseudolus on stage and on screen in A Funny Thing Happened on the Way to the Forum, and Max Bialystock in the original film version of Mel Brooks' The Producers (1967). Mostel was a student of Don Richardson, and he used an acting technique based on muscle memory. He was blacklisted during the 1950s; his testimony before the House Un-American Activities Committee was well publicized. Mostel later starred in the Hollywood Blacklist drama film The Front (1976) alongside Woody Allen, for which Mostel was nominated for the British Academy Film Award for Best Supporting Actor.

Mostel was an Obie Award and three-time Tony Award winner. He is also a member of the American Theater Hall of Fame, inducted posthumously in 1979.

Early life 
Mostel was born in Brooklyn, to Israel Mostel, who was of Eastern European Jewish origin, and Cina "Celia" Druchs, a Polish Jew who was raised in Vienna. The two immigrated to the United States separately – Israel in 1898 and Cina in 1908 – where they met and married. Israel already had four children from his first wife; he had four more children with Cina. Samuel, later known as Zero, was Israel's seventh child.

According to his brother, Bill Mostel, their mother coined the nickname "Zero", noting that if he continued to do poorly at school, he would amount to a zero.

Initially living in the Brownsville section of Brooklyn, the family moved to Moodus, Connecticut, where they bought a farm. The family's income in those days came from a winery and a slaughterhouse. The farm failed, and the family moved back to New York, where his father obtained work as a wine chemist. Mostel was described by his family as outgoing and lively, and with a developed sense of humor. He showed an intelligence and perception that convinced his father he had the makings of a rabbi, but Mostel preferred painting and drawing, a passion he was to retain for life. According to Roger Butterfield, his mother sent him to the Metropolitan Museum of Art to copy paintings while dressed in a velvet suit. Mostel had a favorite painting, John White Alexander's Study in Black and Green, which he copied every day, to the delight of the gallery crowds. One afternoon, while a crowd was watching over his velvet-clad shoulder, he solemnly copied the whole painting upside down, delighting his audience.

In addition to English, Mostel spoke Yiddish, Italian, and German.

He attended Public School 188, where he was an A student. He also received professional training as a painter through The Educational Alliance. He completed his high school education at Seward Park High School, where his yearbook noted: "A future Rembrandt... or perhaps a comedian?".

Mostel attended the City College of New York, a public college that allowed many poor students to pursue higher education. He later claimed that he was on the swimming team and the Reserve Officers Training Corps, though the claim is dubious. As only beginner classes were available in art, Mostel took them repeatedly to be able to paint and receive professional feedback. During that time he worked odd jobs. He graduated in 1935 with a bachelor's degree. He then continued studying towards a master's degree at New York University before leaving after a year to find work. He then joined the Public Works of Art Project (PWAP), which paid him a stipend to teach art.

In 1939 he married Clara Sverd, and the couple moved to an apartment in Brooklyn. The marriage did not last, however, since Clara could not accept the many hours Mostel spent in his studio with his fellow artists, and he did not seem to be able to provide for her at the level to which she had been accustomed. They separated in 1941 and divorced in 1944, Clara only agreeing to the divorce in return for a percentage of Mostel's earnings for the rest of his life. The arrangement lasted until the mid-1950s.

Career

Early comic routines 

Part of Mostel's duty with the Public Works of Art Project (PWAP) was to give gallery talks at New York's museums. Leading groups of students through the many paintings, Mostel could not suppress his comedic nature, and his lectures were noted less for their artistic content than for his sense of humor. As his reputation grew, he was invited to entertain at parties and other social occasions, earning three to five dollars per performance. Labor union social clubs followed, where Mostel mixed his comic routine with social commentary. These performances played a large role in his eventual blacklisting in the next decade.

In 1941, the Café Society, a downtown Manhattan nightclub, approached Mostel with an offer to become a professional comedian and play a regular spot. Mostel accepted, and in the next few months he became the Café Society's main attraction. It was here that he adopted the stage name Zero (Zee to his friends), created by press agent Ivan Black at the behest of Barney Josephson, the proprietor, who felt that "Sam Mostel" was not appropriate for a comic. 

Thus, at the age of 27, Mostel dropped every other job and occupation to start his show business career.

Rise 
Mostel's rise professionally was rapid. In 1942, his salary at the Café Society went up from $40 a week to $450; he appeared on radio shows, opened in two Broadway shows (Keep Them Laughing, Top-Notchers), played at the Paramount Theatre, appeared in an MGM movie (Du Barry Was a Lady), and booked into La Martinique at $4,000 a week. He also made cameo appearances at the Yiddish theatre, which influenced his performance style. In 1943 Life magazine described him as "just about the funniest American now living".

In March 1943, Mostel was drafted by the US Army. Although Mostel gave varying accounts of his Army service, records show he was honorably discharged in August 1943 because of an unspecified physical disability. He subsequently entertained servicemen through the USO until 1945.

Mostel married Kathryn (Kate) Cecilia Harkin, an actress and dancer, on July 2, 1944, after two years of courtship. The pair met at Radio City Music Hall where she was a Rockette. The marriage caused problems in his relationship with his Orthodox Jewish parents:  his new wife was not Jewish. His mother never met Kate or her grandsons. The marriage had problems at times, again mostly due to Mostel's spending most of his time in his art studio. Their relationship was described by friends of the family as complicated, with many fights but having mutual adoration. The couple stayed together until Mostel's death and had two children: film actor Josh Mostel in 1946 and Tobias in 1948.

After Mostel's discharge from the Army, his career resumed. He appeared in a series of plays, musicals, operas, and movies. In 1946 he even made an attempt at serious operatic acting in The Beggar's Opera, but received lukewarm reviews. Critics saw him as a versatile performer.

Mostel made notable appearances on New York City television in the late 1940s. He had his own show in 1948 called Off The Record on WABD with comedian partner Joey Faye. Simultaneously, Mostel had a live TV show on WPIX, Channel Zero. He also appeared in the May 11, 1949 Toast of the Town broadcast hosted by Ed Sullivan.

Blacklist years and HUAC testimony 
Mostel had been a leftist since college and his nightclub routine included political jabs at right-wingers. His MGM contract was terminated, and his role in Du Barry Was a Lady was truncated, because studio executives were upset that he participated in protests against another MGM film, Tennessee Johnson, which protesters believed had downplayed the racism of former US President Andrew Johnson. According to biographer Arthur Sainer, "MGM blacklisted Zero Mostel way before the days of the blacklist".

During his Army service he was under investigation for alleged Communist Party membership. The Military Intelligence Division of the U.S. War Department said it was "reliably reported" that he was a Communist Party member. The Post Intelligence Officer at the Army's Camp Croft, where Mostel served, believed that Mostel was "definitely a Communist." As a result of that, his application to be an entertainment director with the US Army Special Services unit was denied. Mostel had lobbied hard to transfer to Special Services, at one point traveling to Washington to request a transfer.

It was not until 1950 that Mostel again acted in movies, for a role in the Oscar-winning film Panic in the Streets, at the request of its director, Elia Kazan. Kazan describes his attitude and feelings during that period, where
Each director has a favorite in his cast, . . . my favorite this time was Zero Mostel—but not to bully. I thought him an extraordinary artist and a delightful companion, one of the funniest and most original men I'd ever met. . . I constantly sought his company. . . He was one of the three people whom I rescued from the "industry's" blacklist. . . For a long time, Zero had not been able to get work in films, but I got him in my film."

Mostel played supporting roles in five movies for Twentieth Century Fox in 1950, all in films released in 1951. Fox then abruptly cancelled his contract. Mostel learned this after he was loaned out to Columbia for a film role but not permitted on the set. The studio may have received word that he was about to be named as a Communist in Congressional testimony.

On January 29, 1952, Martin Berkeley identified Mostel to the House Un-American Activities Committee (HUAC) as having been a member of the Communist Party. After the testimony he was effectively blacklisted. He was subpoenaed to appear before HUAC on August 14, 1955. Mostel declined to name names and jousted with the members of Congress, invoked the Fifth Amendment, while standing up for his right to the privacy of his personal political beliefs.

His testimony won him admiration in the blacklisted community, and in addition to not naming names he also confronted the committee on ideological matters, something that was rarely done. Among other things, he referred to Twentieth Century Fox as "18th Century Fox" (due to its collaboration with the committee), and manipulated the committee members to make them appear foolish. Mostel later commented: "What did they think I was going to do – sell acting secrets to the Russians?"

The admiration he received for his testimony did nothing to take him off the blacklist, however, and the family had to struggle throughout the 1950s with little income. Mostel used this time to work in his studio. Later he said that he cherished those years for the time it had afforded him to do what he loved most. Mostel's appearance before the HUAC (as well as others) was incorporated into Eric Bentley's 1972 play Are You Now or Have You Ever Been...? During this period he also appeared in many regional productions of shows like Peter Pan (as Captain Hook) and Kismet (as the Wazir), with his name seen prominently in the advertising.

Ulysses in Nighttown and career revival 
In 1957, Toby Cole, a New York theatrical agent who strongly opposed the blacklist, contacted Mostel and asked to represent him. Mostel agreed, and the partnership led to the revival of Mostel's career and made him a household name. Mostel accepted the role of Leopold Bloom in Ulysses in Nighttown, a play based on the novel Ulysses, which he had greatly admired in his youth. It was an Off-Off-Broadway play produced in a small Houston Street theater, but the reviews Mostel received were overwhelmingly favorable. Most notably, Newsweeks Jack Kroll compared him to Laurence Olivier, writing, "Something unbelievable happened. A fat comedian named Zero Mostel gave a performance that was even more astonishing than Olivier's".  Mostel received the Obie award for best Off Broadway performance of the 1958–59 season.

After the success of Ulysses, Mostel received many offers to appear in classic roles, especially abroad; however, he declined the offers because of artistic differences with the directors and the low salaries associated with the roles. By this time the effects of the blacklist were lessening, and in 1959 and 1961 he appeared in two episodes of TV's The Play of the Week.

1960s and height of career 

On January 13, 1960, while exiting a taxi on his way back from rehearsals for the play The Good Soup, Mostel was hit by a number 18 (now the M86) 86th Street crosstown bus, and his leg was crushed. The doctors wanted to amputate the leg, which would have effectively ended his stage career. Mostel refused, accepting the risk of gangrene, and remained hospitalized for four months. The injury took a huge toll; for the rest of his life, the massively-scarred leg gave him pain and required frequent rests and baths. He sought compensation for the injury by retaining the famous Harry Lipsig (the 5'3" self-described "King of Torts") as his attorney. The case was settled for an undisclosed sum. From this time forward, whenever he attended the Metropolitan Opera, Mostel carried a cane to go along with the cape that he also favored.

Later that year Mostel took on the role of Estragon in a TV adaptation of Waiting for Godot. In 1961, he played Jean in Rhinoceros to very favorable reviews. The New Republic's Robert Brustein said that he had "a great dancer's control of movement, a great actor's control of voice, a great mime's control of facial expressions." His transition onstage from man to rhinoceros became a thing of legend; he won his first Tony Award for Best Actor, even though he was not in the lead role.

In 1962 Mostel began work on the role of Pseudolus in the Broadway musical A Funny Thing Happened on the Way to the Forum, which was to be one of his best-remembered roles. The role of Pseudolus was originally offered to Phil Silvers, who declined it, saying he did not want to do this "old shtick". Mostel did not originally want to do the role either, which he thought below his capabilities, but was convinced by his wife and agent. The reviews were excellent, and, after a few slow weeks after which the play was partially rewritten with a new opening song, "Comedy Tonight", which became the play's most popular piece, the show became a great commercial success, running 964 performances and conferring star status on Mostel (he also won a Tony Award for Best Actor in a Musical for this role). A film version was produced in 1966, also starring Mostel – and Silvers.

On September 22, 1964, Mostel opened as Tevye in the original Broadway production of Fiddler on the Roof. Because of Mostel's respect for the works of Sholem Aleichem he insisted that more of the author's mood and style be incorporated into the musical, and he made major contributions to its shape. He also created the cantorial sounds made famous in the song "If I Were a Rich Man". The New York Times wrote "Zero Mostel's Tevye is so penetrating and heartwarming that you all but forget that it is a performance." In later years, the actors who followed Mostel in the role of Tevye invariably followed his staging. The show received rave reviews and was a great commercial success, running 3,242 performances, a record at the time. Mostel received a Tony Award for it and was invited to a reception in the White House, officially ending his status as a political pariah.

Mostel in 1967 appeared as Potemkin in Great Catherine, and the next year he took the role of Max Bialystock in The Producers. Mostel refused to accept the role of Max at first, but director Mel Brooks persuaded him to show the script to his wife, who then talked Mostel into doing it. His performance originally received mixed reviews, and the film overall was not a great success at the time of its release. The comedy, however, has since achieved classic status in the decades after its premiere. Reflecting on that rising popularity, Roger Ebert, longtime critic for the Chicago Sun-Times, wrote in 2000, "This is one of the funniest movies ever made", adding that Mostel's performance "is a masterpiece of low comedy."

He lived in a large rented apartment in The Belnord on the Upper West Side of Manhattan and built a summer house on Monhegan Island in Maine.

Last years 

In his last decade, Mostel's star dimmed as he appeared in movies that were received with indifference by both critics and the general audience.  These titles include The Great Bank Robbery and Once Upon a Scoundrel. In the 1970s, he often played supporting rather than lead roles.

His more notable films in these years include the movie version of Rhinoceros (appearing with his Producers costar Gene Wilder), The Hot Rock and The Front (where he played Hecky Brown, a blacklisted performer whose story bears a similarity to Mostel's own, and for which he was nominated for a BAFTA Award for Best Supporting Actor). Screenwriter Walter Bernstein loosely based the character of Hecky Brown on television actor Philip Loeb, who was a friend of Mostel. On Broadway, he starred in revivals of Ulysses in Nighttown (receiving a Tony nomination for Best Actor) and Fiddler on the Roof. He also made memorable appearances in children's shows such as Sesame Street, The Electric Company (for which he performed the Spellbinder in the Letterman cartoons), and gave voice to the boisterous seagull Kehaar in the animated film Watership Down. He also appeared as a guest star during Season 2 of The Muppet Show, taped during mid-1977 and broadcast after his death.

Death 
During rehearsals for Arnold Wesker's new play The Merchant (in which Mostel played a re-imagined version of Shakespeare's Shylock) in Philadelphia, he collapsed in his dressing room and was taken to Thomas Jefferson University Hospital. He was diagnosed with a respiratory disorder and it was believed he was in no danger and would be released soon. However, on September 8, 1977, Mostel complained of dizziness and lost consciousness. The attending physicians were unable to revive him, and he was pronounced dead that evening. It is believed that he suffered an aortic aneurysm.

Wesker wrote a book chronicling the out-of-town tribulations that beset the play and culminated in Zero's death called The Birth of Shylock and the Death of Zero Mostel.

In accordance with his final requests, his family did not stage any funeral or other memorial service. Mostel was cremated following his death; the location of his ashes is not publicly known.

Professional relationships 
Mostel often collided with directors and other performers in the course of his professional career. He was described as irreverent, believing himself to be a comic genius (many critics agreed with him) and showed little patience for incompetence. He often improvised, which was received well by audiences but which often left other performers (who were not prepared for his ad-libbed lines) confused and speechless during live performances. He often dominated the stage whether or not his role called for it. Norman Jewison stated this as a reason for preferring Chaim Topol for the role of Tevye in the movie version of Fiddler on the Roof. Mostel took exception to these criticisms:

Other producers, such as Jerome Robbins and Hal Prince, preferred to hire Mostel on short contracts, knowing that he would become less faithful to the script as time went on. His exuberant personality, though largely responsible for his success, had also intimidated others in his profession and prevented him from receiving some important roles.

In his autobiography Kiss Me Like a Stranger, actor Gene Wilder describes being initially terrified of Mostel. However, just after being introduced, Mostel got up, walked over to Wilder, hugged him, and planted a big kiss on his lips. Wilder claims to be grateful to Mostel for teaching him such a valuable lesson, and for picking Wilder up every day so that they could ride to work together. He also tells the story of a dinner celebrating the release of The Producers. Mostel switched Wilder's place card with Dick Shawn's, allowing Wilder to sit at the main table. Mostel and Wilder later worked together in Rhinoceros and the Letterman cartoons for the children's show The Electric Company. The two remained close friends until Mostel's death.

Mostel was the subject of the 2006 retrospective play Zero Hour, written and performed by actor/playwright Jim Brochu. The play recounts events from Mostel's life and career, including his HUAC testimony, his professional relationships, and his theatrical work.

Work

Filmography

Television

Stage

Bibliography 
 Zero Mostel Reads A Book Photographs by Robert Frank (New York Times, 1963)
 Zero Mostel's Book of Villains [with Israel Shenker, photographs by Alex Gotfryd] (Doubleday, 1976)

Awards and nominations

References 

 31. Mostel profile, Esquire magazine, Nov. 1, 1962

Sources 
 Zero Mostel: a Biography (1989), Jared Brown, Atheneum, NY
 Isenberg, Barbara (2014). Tradition!: The Highly Improbable, Ultimately Triumphant Broadway-to-Hollywood Story of Fiddler on the Roof, the World's Most Beloved Musical. New York: St. Martin's Press. .

External links 

 
 
 
 
 Zero Mostel at the University of Wisconsin's Actors Studio audio collection
 Zero Mostel at the TCM Movie Database
 
 Playbill article including a Mostel Who's Who entry
 Mostel Testimony to the House Un-American Activities Committee

1915 births
1977 deaths
20th-century American Jews
20th-century American comedians
20th-century American male actors
20th-century American male singers
20th-century American singers
Actors Studio alumni
American male comedians
American male film actors
American male musical theatre actors
American male voice actors
American people of Austrian-Jewish descent
American people of Polish-Jewish descent
Art Students League of New York alumni
City College of New York alumni
Comedians from New York City
Deaths from aortic aneurysm
Hollywood blacklist
Jewish American male actors
Jewish American male comedians
Male actors from New York City
Musicians from Brooklyn
New York University alumni
People from Brownsville, Brooklyn
People from the Upper West Side
Seward Park High School alumni
Tony Award winners
United States Army personnel of World War II
United States Army soldiers